While crime in Antarctica is relatively rare, isolation and boredom affect certain people there negatively and may lead to crime. Alcoholism is a known problem on the continent, and has led to fights and indecent exposure. Other types of crimes that have occurred in Antarctica include illicit drug use, torturing and killing wildlife, racing motorbikes through environmentally sensitive areas, assault with a deadly weapon, attempted murder, and arson. Sexual harassment also has been reported.

Robberies are rare and unlikely in Antarctica because people entering cannot bring many belongings onto the continent, and because there is very little use for money.

Under the 1959 Antarctic Treaty, ratified by 53 nations, persons accused of a crime in Antarctica are subject to punishment by their own country.

National laws applying to crimes in Antarctica

South Africa 
South African citizens in Antarctica are subject to South African law under the South African Citizens in Antarctica Act, 1962. Violations of the Antarctic Treaty System are criminal offences under the Antarctic Treaties Act, 1996. Under these two acts, Antarctica is deemed to be within the jurisdiction of the magistrate's court at Cape Town.

United Kingdom 
The Antarctic Act 1994 extends the laws of every part of the United Kingdom to UK nationals in Antarctica. Additionally, the Commissioner of the British Antarctic Territory may enact laws for the territory.

United States 
The Comprehensive Crime Control Act of 1984 (enacted 12 October 1984) covers crimes committed by Americans or crimes committed against Americans. Any American who is outside of the United States, but not in another country, is still subject to certain U.S. laws. All Americans committing a crime, and any foreigner committing a crime against an American outside of a sovereign state, are subject to prosecution in a U.S. federal court. This includes international waters and Antarctica. Although nations claim territory in Antarctica, the United States does not recognize these claims.

Examples of crimes covered by the Comprehensive Crime Control Act of 1984 include murder, maiming, rape, arson, treason, and bribing a federal official.

List of crimes in Antarctica

 1959 – The Vostok Station (станция Восток), then a Soviet research station in Princess Elizabeth Land, was the scene of a fight between two scientists over a game of chess. When one of them lost the game, he became so enraged that he attacked the other with an ice axe. According to some sources, it was a murder, though other sources say that the attack was not fatal. After a KGB investigation, chess games were banned at Soviet/Russian Antarctic stations by the Antarctic Soviet.

 12 April 1984 – The Almirante Brown Station (Estación Científica Almirante Brown) is an Argentine research station located on the Coughtrey Peninsula by Paradise Harbour. The station's original facilities were burned down by the station's leader and doctor on 12 April 1984 after he was ordered to stay for the winter. The station personnel were rescued by the ship Hero and taken to Palmer Station, an American research station on Anvers Island. The stations are about 58 km (36 mi) apart.

 9 October 1996 – At McMurdo Station, a fight occurred between two workers in the kitchen. One worker attacked the other with a hammer. Another cook tried to break up the fight and was also injured. The two victims were Tony Beyer and Joe Stermer. Both of them required stitches. FBI agents from the United States were sent to McMurdo Station to investigate and make an arrest. The suspect was flown to Honolulu, Hawaii, where he faced charges of four counts of assault with a dangerous weapon. He pleaded not guilty. No further information was publicly available.

 11 May 2000 – On 11 May 2000, at the Amundsen–Scott South Pole Station, an American research station located at the South Pole, Australian astrophysicist Rodney Marks had a fever, stomach pains, and nausea. On 12 May, he died. It was believed at the time that Marks died of natural causes. It was the onset of winter, so his body could not be transported for six months. His body was put into a freezer at the observatory. After the six months were over, Marks' body was flown to Christchurch, New Zealand, for an autopsy. The autopsy concluded that he had died from methanol poisoning. How the poisoning occurred remains a mystery.

 9 October 2018 – On 9 October 2018, a stabbing occurred at the Bellingshausen Station, a Russian research station on King George Island. The perpetrator was Sergey Savitsky (Сергей Савицкий), a 54-year-old electrical engineer. He stabbed Oleg Beloguzov (Олег Белогузов), a 52-year old welder, in the chest multiple times. According to some sources, the attack occurred because Beloguzov was giving away the endings of books that Savitsky checked out at the station's library. Other sources say that the attack occurred in the dining room when Beloguzov teased Savitsky by telling him that he should dance on top of the table to make money. Both accounts say that Savitsky was believed to be intoxicated at the time of the attack. They had worked together at the station for about six months, and Savitsky was apparently having an emotional breakdown. Being in a confined space may have been a major cause for this (see Winter-over syndrome). Both Beloguzov and Savitsky had had problems with each other for several months. Beloguzov was sent to a hospital in Chile. Savitsky surrendered to the manager of the station, and 11 days later was placed on a flight back to Russia, where he was placed on house arrest until 8 or 9 December. On 8 February 2019, Savitsky was at a preliminary hearing at the Vasileostrov District Court of Saint Petersburg. Savitsky was remorseful and was willing to accept a criminal punishment rather than rehabilitation. Beloguzov was forgiving of Savitsky and proposed dropping the case. The public prosecutor was supportive of Beloguzov's proposal, and noted that Savitsky was remorseful and had no prior criminal record. Judge Anatoly Kovin decided to drop the case.

See also
 Demographics of Antarctica
 Religion in Antarctica

References 

Government of Antarctica
Crime